The Letter is an American pre-Code dramatic film directed by Jean de Limur and released by Paramount Pictures. It was the first full-sound feature shot at Astoria Studios, Queens, New York City. A silent version of the film was also released. The film stars stage actress Jeanne Eagels in her final role and O.P. Heggie. The film was adapted by Garrett Fort from the 1927 play The Letter by W. Somerset Maugham. It tells the story of a jealous married woman who kills her lover and is brought to trial.

Plot
Bored and lonely living on her husband's rubber plantation, Leslie Crosbie takes a lover, Geoffrey Hammond, but he eventually tires of her and takes a Chinese mistress, Li-Ti. When Leslie learns of Geoffrey's new mistress, she insists on seeing him while her husband is away and tries to rekindle his love. However, Geoffrey is not moved and informs Leslie that he prefers Li-Ti. Leslie becomes enraged and shoots Geoffrey repeatedly.

At the murder trial, Leslie perjures herself on the stand, claiming that she had little to do with Hammond and that she shot him when he tried to rape her. Meanwhile, Li-Ti's emissary provides Joyce, Leslie's attorney, with a copy of a letter in which Leslie begged Hammond to visit her. Li-Ti is ready to sell it for $10,000, provided Leslie makes the exchange. On Joyce's advice, Leslie agrees. Li-Ti humiliates her but eventually accepts the money. Leslie is found not guilty.

Joyce presents his bill to Leslie's husband Robert, who demands to know why the expenses total $10,000. Joyce relates the story of Li-Ti's blackmail and gives Robert the damning letter. Robert confronts Leslie and forces her to admit everything. Leslie proclaims that she still loves the man whom she had killed. As punishment, Robert keeps her on the plantation even though he no longer has any money.

Cast
Jeanne Eagels as Leslie Crosbie
Reginald Owen as Robert Crosbie
Herbert Marshall as Geoffrey Hammond
Irene Browne as Mrs. Joyce
O.P. Heggie as Mr. Joyce
Lady Tsen Mei as Li-Ti
Tamaki Yoshiwara as Ong Chi Seng

Preservation status
The Letter was long out of circulation. In June 2011, a restored edition of the film was released on home video by Warner Bros. as part of its Warner Archive Collection as a made-on-demand DVD.

Awards and nominations
Jeanne Eagels, who died just months after the film was completed, was posthumously nominated for the Academy Award for Best Actress. She was the first performer to be nominated by the Academy after her death, although all nominations at the 2nd Academy Awards were unofficial, and she was listed among several actresses "under consideration" by a board of judges.

The Letter was included in the Top Ten Films list of 1929 by the National Board of Review.

Remake
Herbert Marshall, who plays Leslie's lover in the film, also appears as her husband in William Wyler's 1940 Warner Bros. remake. Bette Davis received an Oscar nomination for the role of Leslie Crosbie in the 1940 version.

See also
List of rediscovered films

References

External links

online streamed copy of The Letter
The Letter All Movie.com
The Letter at Virtual History
lobby card to The Letter
Notes on The Letter at Toronto Film Society, includes reprints of 1929 reviews

1929 films
1929 crime drama films
1929 romantic drama films
Adultery in films
American crime drama films
American romantic drama films
American silent feature films
American black-and-white films
American courtroom films
1920s English-language films
American films based on plays
Films based on works by W. Somerset Maugham
Films directed by Jean de Limur
American multilingual films
Transitional sound films
Films shot at Astoria Studios
1920s multilingual films
Films with screenplays by Garrett Fort
Films about murder
1920s American films
Silent romantic drama films
Silent American drama films
English-language drama films